Konaseema is a group of islands between the tributaries of the Godavari River and Bay of Bengal located in Dr. B.R. Ambedkar Konaseema district of Andhra Pradesh in southern India. It is nicknamed "Gods Own Creation" due to similarities with the Kerala backwaters.

Geography 
The Godavari delta is surrounded by the tributaries of Vruddha Godavari, Vasishta Godavari, Gautami and Nilarevu rivers.

After crossing the city of Rajahmundry, the Godavari River bifurcates into two distributaries, the Vruddha Gautami (Gautami Godavari) and the Vasishta Godavari, which then further splits into the Gautami and the Nilarevu. Similarly, the Vasishta splits into two branches, the Vasishta and the Vainateya. These branches form a delta 170 km (105 mi) long along the coast of the Bay of Bengal. This delta makes up the Konaseema region.

Amalapuram is the largest town in Konaseema, followed by Razole, Ravulapalem, Kothapeta, and Mummidivaram.

The arched entrance to the Konaseema region was intended to complement the natural colors of the region's land and plant life.

Dindi 
Dindi is a region within the Konaaseema islands which borders the region of Ramarajulanka.

Dindi is known for its virgin backwaters. It features palm-fringed lakes, canals and lagoons dotting the coconut groves. Dindi 80 kilometers from Rajahmundry.

There are two resorts in Dindi which are constructed on the banks of Godavari river.

Economy 
This region is mostly known for its coconut trees and paddy fields. Coconuts grown in Konaseema are widely exported to various places in India.

Pilgrim Places 

Konaseema has many ancient pilgrim places. Some of them include:
 Ainavilli
 Antarvedi
 Ryali
 Gudapalli
 Mandapalli
 Vadapalli
 Appanapalli
 Muramalla
 Palivela
 Vanapalli

See also 

Coastal Andhra
APTDC
Ramarajulanka
Rajahmundry

References 

Godavari River
Bay of Bengal
Coastal Andhra
Geography of Konaseema district
Kakinada
Godavari basin
Sub regions of Andhra Pradesh
River deltas of Asia
Islands of Andhra Pradesh
Islands of India
Populated places in India
Islands of the Bay of Bengal